The 1983 NCAA Division III football season, part of college football in the United States organized by the National Collegiate Athletic Association at the Division III level, began in August 1983, and concluded with the NCAA Division III Football Championship, also known as the Stagg Bowl, in December 1983 at Galbreath Field in Kings Island, Mason, Ohio. The Augustana (IL) Vikings won their first of four consecutive Division III championships by defeating the Union Dutchmen by a final score of 21−17.

Conference and program changes
The Centennial Conference began football play in 1983.
Fisk Bulldogs reclassified from Division II for this season only, their final one.

Conference standings

Conference champions

Postseason
The 1983 NCAA Division III Football Championship playoffs were the 11th annual single-elimination tournament to determine the national champion of men's NCAA Division III college football. The championship Stagg Bowl game was held at Galbreath Field at the College Football Hall of Fame in Kings Island, Mason, Ohio for the first time. Like the previous eight championships, eight teams competed in this edition.

Playoff bracket

See also
1983 NCAA Division I-A football season
1983 NCAA Division I-AA football season
1983 NCAA Division II football season

References